Markets in Crypto-Assets (MiCA) is a proposed regulation in EU law.
It is intended to help streamline distributed ledger technology (DLT) and virtual asset regulation in the European Union (EU) whilst protecting users and investors.

Title
The full name of the 24 September 2020 proposal is the "Proposal for a REGULATION OF THE EUROPEAN PARLIAMENT AND OF THE COUNCIL on Markets in Crypto-assets, and amending Directive (EU) 2019/1937 COM/2020/593 final".
MiCA is part of a Digital Finance Package that intends to transform the European economy in the coming decades.

Function
MiCA provides legal certainty around crypto assets – cryptocurrencies, security tokens and stablecoins. It is similar to Europe’s Markets in Financial Instruments Directive (MiFID), which is a legal framework for securities markets, investment intermediaries and trading venues. It is expected to be different than the UK crypto regulatory framework that has chosen to start by regulating only a few crypto assets, while EU through MiCA will impose a wider focus.

Timeline
Groundwork for MiCA started in 2018 due to increased public interest within the EU in cryptocurrencies. The European Commission adopted the digital finance package which included MiCA in September 2020, leading to extensive discussions among the preparatory bodies (the EU Council, the European Central Bank, the Economic and Social Committee). The vote in the European Commission whether to introduce the proposed MiCA regulatory framework for crypto assets within the European Union has been delayed until February 2023.  MiCA regulation is expected to come into force by 1st of January 2024.

External links
 MiCA on europa.eu
 Procedure 2020/0265/COD on EUR-Lex
 Procedure 2020/0265(COD) on ŒIL

References 

Blockchains
Cryptocurrencies
Draft European Union laws